Yuri Fyodorovich Marushkin (10 July 1944 – 12 December 2015) was a Russian football player and manager.

References

External links
 

1944 births
2015 deaths
Soviet footballers
FC Dynamo Bryansk players
Soviet football managers
Russian football managers
FC Kuban Krasnodar managers
FC Rotor Volgograd managers
Russian Premier League managers
FC Dynamo Moscow reserves players
Association football midfielders
Sportspeople from Volgograd